Operation Arbead II was an operation of the Iraq War.

Iraqi Army Soldiers, Iraqi Police and Marines completed Operation Arbead II in Fallujah 18 January. The operation to detain members of a murder and intimidation cell within the Mualimeen, Ardaloos and Risalah-Jubayl Districts was led by Iraqi forces with support from the Marines of Regimental Combat Team 5.

During the operation, Soldiers of the 1st Iraqi Army Division's 2nd Brigade, members of the Fallujah Police Department and Marines from RCT-5 detained 36 individuals suspected of coordinating insurgent attacks against Iraqi Security Forces or Coalition Forces. Five of the detainees have been positively identified as persons of special interest according to intelligence reports.

"This operation was a necessity in order to eliminate a threat to the Iraqi citizens of these districts," said Lt. Col. Daniel T. Thoele, Military Transition Team advisor to 2nd Brigade. "The combined operation was a success and it demonstrates that Iraqi Security Forces are eager in continuing these operations to ensure that their communities are safe and secure."
"It was less than two years ago when there were about three thousand Marines stationed inside Fallujah," said Coalition Forces spokesperson 1st Lt. Barry L. Edwards. "But now, with the Iraqi Army as capable as they are and the growing number of police taking responsibility for security in the city, there are only a hundred or so Marines here serving as advisors."
There were no reports of civilians or Coalition Forces injured or killed as a result of the operation.

Military Units Involved
US forces reported to be involved were
Regimental Combat Team 5

Iraqi Forces reported to be involved
Fallujah Police Department
1st Iraqi Army Division's 2nd Brigade

Casualties
No US deaths were reported during the operation, however four US soldiers were wounded during the operation.

References

 Multi National Corps Iraq
 National Force Iraq

Military operations of the Iraq War in 2007
Military operations of the Iraq War involving the United States
Military operations of the Iraq War involving Iraq
Iraqi insurgency (2003–2011)
United States Marine Corps in the Iraq War